is a Japanese parliamentary caucus consisting of Yoshimi Watanabe and Takashi Tachibana, later Satoshi Hamada after Tachibana forfeited his seat, in the House of Councillors. It was also a political party led by Watanabe from 2009 until its dissolution in 2014.

History 
Led by Yoshimi Watanabe, who split from the Liberal Democratic Party (LDP), the party was founded on August 8, 2009 after then-Prime Minister Taro Aso dissolved the lower house. One concept behind the party was to make the government more democratic, and to eliminate control of the government by non-elected members established in the bureaucracy. In this respect, Watanabe has repeatedly stated that his position is compatible with the Democratic Party of Japan.

Your Party advocated lower taxation, free enterprise, smaller government, and less regulation.

The party fielded 13 candidates in the August 2009 general elections. Five of those candidates were elected to the lower house. In the 2010 house of Councillors election, it gained 10 seats. It also made gains at the 2011 regional elections, and in the 2012 general election, where it increased its seats from eight in the lower house to eighteen.

Following an announcement by Prime Minister Shinzō Abe for an election to be held in December 2014, the party's 20 members voted on November 19, 2014 to disband on November 28, 2014. Falling support and disagreement over whether to side with the ruling coalition in the upcoming election were identified as reasons for the split.

Presidents of YP

Election results

House of Representatives

House of Councillors

References

External links
 

Conservative parties in Japan
Libertarian parties in Japan
Political parties established in 2009
2009 establishments in Japan
Political parties disestablished in 2014
2014 disestablishments in Japan
Neoliberal parties